is a private junior college in Hatoyama, Saitama, Japan, established in 1989. The predecessor of the school was founded in 1922.

References

External links
 Official website 

Japanese junior colleges
Educational institutions established in 1922
Private universities and colleges in Japan
Universities and colleges in Saitama Prefecture
1922 establishments in Japan